

Films

References

Notes

Films
2011
2011-related lists